Swatek is a surname. Notable people with the surname include:

Barret Swatek (born 1977), American actress and comedian
Edwin Swatek (1885–1966), American swimmer and water polo player

See also
Świątek